The Women's welterweight competition at the 2009 World Taekwondo Championships was held at the Ballerup Super Arena in Copenhagen, Denmark on October 14. Welterweights were limited to a maximum of 67 kilograms in body mass.

Medalists

Results
Legend
DQ — Won by disqualification
WD — Won by withdrawal

Finals

Top half

Section 1

Section 2

Bottom half

Section 3

Section 4

References
Draw
 Official Report

Women's 67
World